The 1916 United States presidential election in Massachusetts took place on November 7, 1916, as part of the 1916 United States presidential election, which was held throughout all contemporary 48 states. Voters chose 18 representatives, or electors to the Electoral College, who voted for president and vice president.

Massachusetts was won by the Republican nominee, U.S. Supreme Court Justice Charles Evans Hughes of New York, and his running mate Senator Charles W. Fairbanks of Indiana. Hughes and Fairbanks defeated the Democratic nominees, incumbent Democratic President Woodrow Wilson and Vice President Thomas R. Marshall.

Hughes carried the state with 50.54%, to Wilson's 46.61%, a Republican victory margin of 3.93%. Coming in a distant third was Socialist candidate Allan L. Benson, who took 2.08%.

Massachusetts had long been a typical Yankee Republican bastion in the wake of the Civil War, having voted Republican in every election from 1856 through 1908. However, in 1912, former Republican President Theodore Roosevelt had run as a Progressive candidate against incumbent Republican President William Howard Taft, splitting the Republican vote and allowing Woodrow Wilson win Massachusetts, becoming the first Democratic presidential candidate to do so, though with a plurality of only 35.53% of the vote. With the Republican base re-united behind Hughes in 1916, Massachusetts was returned to the Republican column.

Hughes won 12 out of 14 counties in the State of Massachusetts, while Wilson won only 2 . The race was kept close statewide by the fact that Wilson carried Suffolk County, home to the state's capital and largest city, Boston. Wilson's only other county victory was the small island of Nantucket. However both candidates had fair levels of support across the state, as neither got more than 60% of the vote in any county. As Wilson narrowly won re-election nationwide, Massachusetts ended weighing in as about 7% more Republican than the national average.

Wilson is the last Democrat to win a presidential election while losing either Massachusetts or neighboring Rhode Island, although he had previously carried both states in 1912.

As of 2021, this is the last time that the town of Granville voted Democratic.

Results

Results by county

See also
 United States presidential elections in Massachusetts

References

Massachusetts
1916
1916 Massachusetts elections